The Communauté de communes de la Brie des Rivières et Châteaux is a communauté de communes in the Seine-et-Marne département and in the Île-de-France région of France. It was formed on 1 January 2017 by several communes of the former Communauté de communes La Brie Centrale, Communauté de communes Les Gués de l'Yerres, Communauté de communes du Pays de Seine, Communauté de communes Vallées et Châteaux and Communauté de communes de l'Yerres à l'Ancœur. Its seat is in Le Châtelet-en-Brie. Its area is 366.2 km2, and its population was 39,557 in 2019.

Composition
The communauté de communes consists of the following 31 communes:

Andrezel
Argentières
Beauvoir
Blandy
Bombon
Champdeuil
Champeaux
Le Châtelet-en-Brie
Châtillon-la-Borde
Chaumes-en-Brie
Coubert
Courquetaine
Crisenoy
Échouboulains
Les Écrennes
Évry-Grégy-sur-Yerre
Féricy
Fontaine-le-Port
Fouju
Grisy-Suisnes
Guignes
Machault
Moisenay 
Ozouer-le-Voulgis
Pamfou
Saint-Méry
Sivry-Courtry
Soignolles-en-Brie
Solers
Valence-en-Brie
Yèbles

References 

Brie des Rivières et Châteaux
Brie des Rivières et Châteaux